This is a list of cities and towns found in KwaZulu-Natal, South Africa. They are divided according to the districts in which they are located.

In the case of settlements that have had their official names changed the traditional name is listed first followed by the new name.

Amajuba 

 Dannhauser
 Hattingspruit
 Madadeni
 Newcastle
 Mountain View (Osizweni)
 Charlestown
 Ngagane
 Emadlangeni
 Kingsley

eThekwini 

ekuPhakameni
Adams Mission
Amanzimtoti 
Assagay 
Botha's Hill
Cato Ridge 
Chatsworth 
Clermont
Durban 
Gillitts 
Hillcrest 
Inanda
Inchanga 
Isipingo 
Kingsburgh 
Kloof
KwaMakhutha 
KwaMashu
La Mercy 
Mpumalanga 
New Germany 
Ntuzuma
Tongaat (oThongathi)
Pinetown
Phoenix 
Prospecton
Queensburgh 
Shallcross 
Umbumbulu 
Umdloti (eMdloti)
Umgababa 
Umhlanga (uMhlanga)
Umkomaas 
Umlazi 
Verulam
Westville

Harry Gwala 

 Bulwer
 Franklin
 Himeville
 Stuartstown (Ixopo)
 Kokstad
 Umzimkulu
 Underberg

iLembe 

Ballito
Stanger (KwaDukuza)
Salt Rock
Mandeni
Maphumulo

Ugu 

 Anerley
 Bazley Beach 
 Dududu
 Harding
 Hibberdene
 Ifafa Beach
 Izingolweni (Ezinqoleni)
 Kelso
 Margate
 Melville
 Umtalumi (Mtwalume)
 Munster
 Palm Beach
 Park Rynie
 Pennington
 Port Edward 
 Port Shepstone
 Ramsgate
 Scottburgh 
 Sezela
 Shelly Beach
 Southbroom
 Umtentweni
 Umzinto
 Umzumbe
 Uvongo
 Weza

uMgungundlovu 

 Balgowan
 Boston
 Hilton
 Howick
 Merrivale
 Mooi River
 New Hanover
 Pietermaritzburg
 Richmond
 Wartburg
 Dalton
 Harding

UMkhanyakude 

 Hluhluwe
 Ingwavuma
 Mkuze
 Mtubatuba
 Ubombo
 Jozini
 Mbazwana
 Kosi Bay town (Manguzi)

Umzinyathi 

 Dundee
 Glencoe
 Greytown
 Kranskop
 Pomeroy
 Wasbank
 Nquthu

uThukela 

 Bergville
 Colenso
 Elandslaagte
 Estcourt
 Ladysmith

King Cetshwayo  

 Empangeni
 Eshowe
 Melmoth
 Mtunzini
 Richards Bay
 Nkandla

Zululand 

 Babanango
 Louwsburg
 Mahlabatini
 Nongoma
 Paulpietersburg
 Pongola
 Ulundi
 Vryheid

 
KwaZulu-Natal